Ros Ramona Qadira binti Mohd Zamzam (born June 25, 1990) is a Malaysian actress who works in television and film. She was a contestant of Dewi Remaja 2009/10.

Personal life 
Ramona is a Malay of Pakistani, German and Thai descent. She was born in Bukit Mertajam, Penang and grew up in Ipoh, Perak. She is the eldest of two siblings. At the age of four, she was sent to a Chinese school. She holds a degree in business at SEGI College (now SEGi University).

Zamzam married Palestinian man Rami Alashkar on May 1, 2015. The couple have a daughter, Ivanna Alashkar.

Filmography

Film

References

External links
 

1990 births
Living people
Malaysian actresses
Malaysian film actresses
People from Penang
Malaysian people of Malay descent
Malaysian people of Thai descent
Malaysian people of Pakistani descent
Malaysian people of German descent
Malaysian Muslims